Joseph Matthias Hubertus Goebbels (19 March 1836 – 6 September 1911) was a German Catholic Priest and artist. Goebbels served as a Roman Catholic priest at the Church of Sankt Maria im Kapitol in Cologne, Germany and became a noted painter of church interiors. 

He was born in Baesweiler and his father was from Aldenhoven, Germany.

Works 
Goebbels painted in the historicist style of the Nazarene movement and decorated the walls of more than 20 churches in the Rhineland region. The interiors of Rolduc Abbey near Kerkrade, Netherlands are considered his masterpiece. Many of his paintings are no longer extant today, however well-preserved examples can be found near Rolduc, in particular at St. Briktius in Oekoven-Rommerskirchen (pictured) and at the former Marienborn Monastery in the village of Hoven near Zülpich, Germany. He was also commissioned to paint the wings on the late Gothic altarpiece at Antwerp Cathedral with pictures from the life of Jesus.

Legacy 
In appreciation of his services, in 1892 he was appointed Canon at Aachen Minster. Although a tomb in Aachen was built for him, his wishes were to be buried in his birthplace, so he is instead buried in Baesweiler cemetery. In the spring of 2007, a town square in front of the cemetery was named after him.

References

Literature 
 Klaus Hardering: Die Abteikirche von Klosterrath: Baugeschichte und Bedeutung = De Abdijkerk te Rolduc. Utrecht: Clavis, 1998. (Clavis kunsthistorische monografieen; 18) 
 Anke Twachtmann-Schlichter: Matthias Goebbels: Dekorationsmalerei und Kirchenrestaurierung im 19. Jahrhundert in Köln. Hildesheim; Zürich; New York: Olms 1994 (Studien zur Kunstgeschichte ; Bd. 89) Zugl.: Münster (Westfalen), Univ., Diss., 1992

External links 
 

1836 births
1911 deaths
People from Aachen (district)
19th-century German Roman Catholic priests
Nazarene painters